The Château de Bourmont is a converted castle in the commune of Freigné in the Lot département of France.

History
The family of La Tour-Landry and, later, the Maillé de La Tour-Landry, held the lands of Bourmont from the 14th century. Through an alliance in 1691 between Marie-Hélène de Maillé de La Tour-Landry (1670-1752) and Marie-Henry, Count of Ghaisne (1662-1710), it passed to the family of Ghaisne de Bourmont, who still own it.

In 1771, the Château de Bourmont was the birthplace of Louis-Auguste-Victor, Count de Ghaisnes de Bourmont, architect of the  French conquest of Algeria in 1830. The conquest led to him being appointed Maréchal de France (Marshal of France).

In 1795, during the Chouannerie, vicomte de Scépaux established his headquarters there.

Architecture 
There are remains of an important defensive military structure from the Middle Ages. The château was extended with the construction of buildings from the 16th century to the end of the 19th. The two commons and the orangery were built in 1702 in the Louis XIV style. The residence dates from 1892, constructed in Neo-Gothic style by Bibard and Lediberder.

The château is privately owned and not open to the public. It has been partially listed since 1993 as a monument historique by the French Ministry of Culture.

See also
List of castles in France

References

External links
 

Castles in Pays de la Loire
Châteaux in Maine-et-Loire
Monuments historiques of Pays de la Loire